Joseph Patrick Kenda (born November 14, 1946) is a retired Colorado Springs Police Department detective lieutenant who was involved in 387 homicide cases over a 23-year career, solving 356, a closure rate of 92%. He is featured on the Investigation Discovery television show Homicide Hunter, where he recounts stories of cases he has solved. Kenda also hosts the Discovery+ show American Detective.

Early life 
Kenda was born and raised in Herminie, Pennsylvania on November 14, 1946, about 30 miles (48 km) southeast of Pittsburgh. His paternal grandparents immigrated in 1913 from Čezsoča in what is now Slovenia; his grandfather Josef, for whom he was named, was killed in a coal mining accident in 1933. His father, William, served as an intelligence officer in the United States Army during World War II and later ran a trucking business. His mother, Virginia (née Morrissey), was originally from Colorado Springs. At a young age, Kenda was fascinated with crime, especially murder. He recalls a childhood trip to the Pittsburgh Zoo, where a sign near the primate house declared, "Around this corner is the most dangerous animal on Earth"; turning a corner Kenda found himself staring into a mirror.

He graduated from Greensburg Central Catholic High School in 1964. He attended the University of Pittsburgh, and he married his high school girlfriend Mary Kathleen "Kathy" Mohler in 1967. After graduating with a B.A. in political science, Kenda earned a master's degree in international relations from Ohio State University in 1970. He abandoned plans for a career with the Foreign Service after a classified briefing with the Central Intelligence Agency left him unimpressed. He worked for a time at his father's trucking business. In 1973, Kenda, his wife and two children moved to Colorado Springs, where he joined the police department. Kenda credits his uncle Dan Morrissey for inspiring him to become a police officer.

Law enforcement career 
With the Colorado Springs Police Department (CSPD), Kenda eventually became a homicide detective. He worked in the CSPD homicide unit from 1977-1981 and 1984-1996. He ultimately led the homicide department. "I loved the work," he said. "My wife – not so much." He investigated 387 homicide cases, solving 356, with a closure rate of 92%. He credited his ability to close cases to being a student of human nature and being good at telling when people were lying. In 1973, a young Hispanic female shot herself in her apartment building; when police arrived, they determined the woman had been dead for four days. This was the first time Kenda had seen a dead body, which shook him to the core. Kenda questioned whether or not he made the right decision becoming a cop saying, "I got home that night, I couldn't eat, I couldn't sleep, I couldn't do anything." The next day Kenda was sitting in his police car, and he decided that Law Enforcement was what he wanted to do.

In 1974, after not being allowed to partake in an investigation of a shooting that nearly ended his life, Kenda was even more motivated to become a detective. Kenda said he wanted to be a part of the resolution. Finally, in 1977,  Kenda got his chance when he volunteered to take over an attempted murder case deemed unsolvable by veteran detectives. Detectives laughed at Kenda but ended up giving him the case. Kenda's only evidence was a bracelet with the name "Ingrid" engraved on it. As the days went by, Kenda questioned whether or not he would be able to solve the case, but he refused to give up. Kenda decided to travel to every jeweler in Colorado Springs that owned an engraving machine. Kenda was worried that the bracelet was made outside the city but refused to consider that possibility. Kenda eventually found the store, and while looking through receipts, he found the address belonging to Ingrid. He then looked up every incident at the address and discovered that Ingrid's boyfriend was 21-year-old, Fred Henry Swain. Swain had a very long criminal record, including assault with a deadly weapon and armed robbery. Kenda knew he had found the right guy, but he feared a lack of evidence would prevent an arrest warrant from being made; Kenda wrote a 17-page arrest warrant detailing everything about the case to convince a judge. The judge agreed, and Kenda headed out to make the arrest. Kenda and a fellow officer successfully arrested Fred Swain as he approached his residence. Kenda looked for more evidence and eventually found the gun used in the shooting inside Fred Swain's home. Detectives were stunned that Kenda had solved the case, and after his hard work was over, Kenda was officially moved to the Homicide Unit. He would stay in homicide for three years until he was promoted to Sergeant in 1980. He then went back to homicide in 1984.

On September 12, 1990, Kenda investigated the murder of the 32-year-old mother of three, Dianne Elaine Hood, who was murdered outside of her lupus support group meeting by a masked assailant who took her purse. The attacker was later identified as 28-year-old Jennifer Reali. After over an hour of intense interrogation, Reali finally confessed to killing Dianne Hood. However, Reali shocked Kenda and his team when she revealed that the mastermind behind the murder was Dianne's husband, Brian Hood. Reali explained that she had been having an affair with Brian Hood for the last eight months and that Brian had kept pushing her to kill Dianne. Brian had told Jennifer their lives would be better with Dianne's death. Hood told Reali that if she made the murder look like a robbery gone wrong, the cops would believe it was a random crime and will never be able to find out who did it. And with a $200,000 life insurance policy on Dianne Hood, Reali and Hood believed they would get the money and live happily ever after. On December 23, 1991, Brian Hood was found guilty of two counts of Criminal Solicitation and one count of Conspiracy for killing his wife, Dianne Hood. However, Hood was found not guilty of First-Degree Murder and was only sentenced to 37 years in prison, leaving Kenda and fellow detectives disappointed. Three months later, in 1992, Jennifer Reali was found guilty of First-Degree Murder and Conspiracy to commit First-Degree Murder and was sentenced to life in prison. According to Kenda, the case "met the standard for a Hollywood plot" and received a great deal of media attention, including a People magazine story and several books.

Near the end of his career, Kenda had become consumed with his work, even calling himself an "adrenaline junkie." His wife Kathy became convinced that he would be murdered on the job. However, Kenda didn't care because he was obsessed with his work. In a bad part of town on November 9, 1995, A 14-year-old kid who fell in with the wrong crowd named James Leonard "J.L." Jackson was killed while driving with his friends. Hours earlier, Jackson and his friends had exchanged death threats with their high school rivals which had no meaning whatsoever as it was kids being kids. After the threats were made, one of the kids, named Matthew, called his older brother Eugene Tuiletufuga telling him that Jackson's friends had threatened to kill him. Eugene, who is a gangster, was outraged and grabbed his Mac-11 and headed towards the school. Once he found the car J.L and his friends were in, they mercilessly opened fire, killing J.L. in the process. When Kenda solved the case, he arrived home around 1'o clock in the morning and found Kathy crying. She confronted him, saying that she couldn't wait for him anymore. It was at that moment that Kenda considered retiring. His family moved to Falcon, Colorado in 1993, and Kenda retired three years later. Kenda later explained in his book and in an interview in 2018 that his decision to retire was motivated by an incident in August 1996 involving a 74-year-old man who had sexually assaulted his five-year-old grandson; as there were no open interrogation rooms that day, Kenda had the man brought to his office. When the man tried to justify his abuse by saying the boy "came onto him", Kenda recalled that he "wanted to just kill this guy" and put his hands on him before fellow officers intervened, and Kenda ordered the man taken out of his office. He then sat down at his typewriter and typed out his letter of retirement, effective September 1, 1996.

For the next several years, Kenda was unhappy with retirement and went through a withdrawal stage. He then worked as a special needs school bus operator for a decade starting in 1998. Both his retirement from the CSPD and period as a bus driver are shown in The End, the final episode of Homicide Hunter. Kenda had developed PTSD from his work; he describes it as "having a nightmare while you're awake." However, Kenda believes that it was worth it.
On November 30, 1991, 16-year-old runaway Margaret Ann "Maggie" Fetty was murdered by her friends and dumped in the mountains. When Kenda was investigating the crime scene, he noticed a fox sitting down watching them investigate the scene. The fox refused to leave, and once Kenda and his team were finished, the fox finally ran off. After solving the case, no one called or asked about Maggie. Kenda and his fellow law enforcement officers decided to bury Maggie Fetty themselves. When they went to buy a headstone for Maggie, Kenda asked them to put a fox on the headstone. When they laid Maggie to rest, it was a heartbreaking reminder to Kenda of why he chose a career in law enforcement.

Television career
By 2008, Denver television series editor Patrick Bryant had worked as a freelancer for several production companies for over ten years, having edited over two hundred episodes of various series on networks including Discovery Channel, Animal Planet, HGTV, Food Channel and TLC. He also edited sizzle reels for development departments of production companies, helping with their efforts to sell new series to TV networks. In 2009 Bryant decided to try to create his own series as a producer independently. Unscripted reenactment American crime series was extremely popular at the time, a logical choice for Bryant's first effort. Years prior, Bryant had lived in Colorado Springs and worked at a local TV station when Kenda was in charge of the Major Crimes Unit. Bryant had interviewed Kenda as part of a TV special about the local drug trade tied to a rising homicide rate. Kenda left a lasting impression on Bryant as a great interview subject. In 2009 Bryant contacted Kenda to discuss the possibility of developing a TV series built around his career as a homicide detective. Kenda was slow to respond but eventually struck an agreement to pursue the development of the series with Bryant. A  5-minute sizzle reel created by Bryant and Kenda was shown to FOX21 Studios in Los Angeles, who shopped the series to multiple TV networks. It was acquired by Investigation Discovery in 2010 and went into production in February 2011.

Kenda surprised television producers when they asked him to read a script. He refused, stating, "I'm not an actor. I'm a policeman. If you want me to tell you about this case, I will. If you want me to read that, get somebody else." He spoke extemporaneously for 15 minutes without a script, and the producers were enthralled. He worked without a script for the rest of the series. The series was titled Homicide Hunter: Lt Joe Kenda and first aired in September 2011 on the Investigation Discovery network, becoming a top viewer rating performer. Kenda was noted for his unerringly smooth, matter-of-fact deadpan delivery of the often gruesome details of the crimes he's investigated and repeatedly stating, "Well, my my my...", which quickly became his catchphrase. In each episode, Kenda's present-day recollections are interspersed with reenactments and additional commentary from police officers, journalists, victims' families, and others involved in the cases.

Kenda gave producers 30 of his past cases to read, and they picked the ten they believed were most suited for television audiences. The first season was shot in Hollywood, but all reenactments since were filmed in Knoxville, Tennessee and the surrounding area. Casting calls for actors were periodically held in the Knoxville area. The younger Kenda was portrayed by actor Carl Marino, a former deputy sheriff in Monroe County, New York. Kenda admitted he looked over the case files before shooting but said his memory for the cases is "absolutely perfect" due to the details of murders he investigated being "burn[ed] into your brain." Each episode took four hours to shoot. He has been humbled by the success of the show, which ran for nine seasons and has aired throughout the world. Kenda announced in May 2019 that the ninth season of Homicide Hunter would be the last, believing that the number of cases remaining was insufficient to sustain another season, as they were either "too simple or simply too disgusting to be on television", and preferring to end the series "at the top of my game". The series finale, appropriately titled "The End", aired on January 29, 2020.

However, he would still appear in other Investigation Discovery programs. In early 2020, Kenda told an interviewer that he was filming a new series but was not ready to provide specifics. In December 2020, the new series was announced as American Detective with Lt. Joe Kenda, with each episode featuring Kenda discussing the cases of different homicide detectives in the United States. It premiered on January 4, 2021, with the launch of the new Discovery+ streaming service.

Personal life

Kenda married his high school girlfriend, Mary Kathleen "Kathy" Mohler, on December 26, 1967. They have two children — Dan, a retired United States Navy commander, and Kris, a retired United States Air Force major. They all appeared on the Homicide Hunter episode "Married to the Job", which aired on February 6, 2019,  and in the series finale "The End" on January 29, 2020.

Since 2017, he has been residing in the Tidewater region of Virginia.

References

Further reading

External links 

Homicide Hunter on Investigation Discovery

1946 births
American police detectives
Living people
Ohio State University alumni
People from Colorado Springs, Colorado
University of Pittsburgh alumni
American people of Slovenian descent